Patrick V.M.J. Maselis is a Belgian industrialist and philatelist who signed the Roll of Distinguished Philatelists in 2012. He is president of the Club de Monte-Carlo de l'Elite de la Philatélie. He was elected president of the Royal Philatelic Society London for two years from June 2017 in succession to Frank Walton.

Business career
Maselis is a chemist by training, and the managing director of a Belgian cereal manufacturing company.

Philately
Maselis specialises in the philately of Belgium and its former colonies.

References

External links
http://www.maselis.be/en/index.php

Belgian philatelists
Living people
Signatories to the Roll of Distinguished Philatelists
Year of birth missing (living people)
Belgian business executives
Presidents of the Royal Philatelic Society London
Flemish businesspeople